Simone Uggetti (born 24 July 1973 in Sant'Angelo Lodigiano) is an Italian politician.

He is a member of the Democratic Party and served as Mayor of Lodi from June 2013 to July 2016.

See also
2013 Italian local elections
List of mayors of Lodi, Lombardy

References

External links

1973 births
Living people
Mayors of Lodi, Lombardy
Democratic Party (Italy) politicians